Phrynetini is a tribe of longhorn beetles of the subfamily Lamiinae. It was described by Thomson in 1864.

Taxonomy
 Brachytritus Quedenfeldt, 1882
 Calothyrza Thomson, 1868
 Eurysops Chevrolat, 1855
 Homelix Thomson, 1858
 Mimocalothyrza Breuning & Téocchi, 1982
 Paraphryneta Breuning, 1937
 Paromelix Aurivillius, 1907
 Phryneta Dejean, 1835
 Phrynetoides Duvivier, 1891
 Phrynetopsis Kolbe, 1894
 Pseudhomelix Breuning, 1937
 Stenophryneta Aurivillius, 1907

References

 
Lamiinae